Lista is a former municipality located in the old Vest-Agder county in Norway.  The  municipality existed from 1838 until its dissolution in 1965. The administrative centre was the village of Vanse where Vanse Church is located. Lista municipality was historically known as the municipality of Vanse until 1911.  The former municipality's land is now located in the present-day municipality of Farsund in Agder county.

Farsund Airport, Lista is located here, but it has not had any regularly scheduled commercial flights since 1999; however, there are discussions to use it as a base for offshore operations. Lista is located on a large peninsula along the Listafjorden and is home to the villages of Vestbygd and Vanse and the town of Farsund.

Name
The municipality was named "Vanse" from its creation in 1838 until 1911 when the name was changed to Lista.  The original name of the municipality (and the historic parish) was originally named after the old Vanse farm, where the first Vanse Church was built.  This name was changed in 1911 to bring back the historic name of Lista for this region of Vest-Agder county. Lista is the name of the peninsula where the municipality is located.

The name Lista is derived from the Norwegian word lista which means "edge" or "rim". From 1662 until 1919, Vest-Agder county was named "Lister og Mandals amt", signifying the significance of the area. (The name Lista was misunderstood by Danish clerks as a plural form and therefore written with the plural ending -er.)

History
The municipality of Vanse was established on 1 January 1838 (see formannskapsdistrikt law). According to the 1835 census, the municipality had a population of 4,213.  On 1 January 1903, an area with 99 inhabitants was transferred from Vanse to the neighboring town of Farsund. Again in 1948, another area with 64 inhabitants was transferred from Lista to the town of Farsund. During the 1960s, there were many major municipal mergers across Norway due to the work of the Schei Committee.  On 1 January 1965, the municipalities of Lista, Herad, and Spind were merged with the town of Farsund to create a new, larger municipality of Farsund. Prior to the merger, Lista had a population of 4,544.

Government
All municipalities in Norway, including Lista, are responsible for primary education (through 10th grade), outpatient health services, senior citizen services, unemployment and other social services, zoning, economic development, and municipal roads.  The municipality was governed by a municipal council of elected representatives, which in turn elected a mayor.

Municipal council
The municipal council  of Lista was made up of representatives that were elected to four year terms.  The party breakdown of the final municipal council was as follows:

Notable people 
 Evert Andersen
 Marquis of Lista

See also
List of former municipalities of Norway

References

External links

Weather information for Lista 

Farsund
Former municipalities of Norway
1838 establishments in Norway
1965 disestablishments in Norway